Kalvin Lumbombo Kalala (born 16 February 1998) is a French professional footballer as a winger for Dulwich Hamlet.

Career
Born in Paris, Kalala played in Italy for  Jolly Montemurlo, Carpi and Savona.

He signed for English club Cheltenham Town in August 2018, making his debut on 4 August 2018. On 5 October 2018, Kalala left Cheltenham after his contract was cancelled by mutual consent. 

On 11 October 2018 Kalala signed for Torquay United of the National League South on a contract until January 2019; Torquay manager Gary Johnson had also been Kalala's manager at Cheltenham. He scored his first Torquay United goal with the opener against Winchester City on 20 October 2018 in a 4–1 FA Cup qualifying match victory. Kalala scored his first league goals for Torquay with a brace in a 3—0 win at Hampton & Richmond on 22 December 2018. In January 2019, Kalala signed an extension to his Torquay contract, believed to be until May 2020. He left the club at the end of the 2019–20 season, with Torquay announcing that they would be seeking compensation if he signed for another club as he was under 24. In July 2021 he underwent a trial with German club FSV Zwickau. He later returned to France and signed for Entente Feignies Aulnoye.

He returned to England in December to play with Dartford. On 22 June 2022, it was confirmed that Kalala had left Dartford.

On 13 July 2022, it was announced that Kalala had signed for Dulwich Hamlet after a successful trial.

Personal life
Born in France, Lumombo Kalala is of Congolese descent.

Career statistics

References

1998 births
Living people
French footballers
French sportspeople of Democratic Republic of the Congo descent
A.S.D. Jolly Montemurlo players
A.C. Carpi players
Savona F.B.C. players
Cheltenham Town F.C. players
Torquay United F.C. players
Entente Feignies Aulnoye FC players
Dartford F.C. players
Dulwich Hamlet F.C. players
English Football League players
Association football wingers
French expatriate footballers
French expatriate sportspeople in Italy
Expatriate footballers in Italy
French expatriate sportspeople in England
Expatriate footballers in England
Black French sportspeople